The Wars is a Canadian drama film, directed by Robin Phillips and released in 1983. An adaptation of the novel The Wars by Timothy Findley, the film centres on Robert Ross (Brent Carver), the immature and closeted gay son of an upper class Rosedale family who enlists to serve in the Canadian Army during World War I.

As with the novel, the film blends a number of scenes set at war with depictions of the formative experiences from childhood that have led Robert to enlist, including his relationships with his disabled sister Rowena (Ann-Marie MacDonald) and their parents (William Hutt and Martha Henry). The cast was drawn predominantly from the stable of actors Phillips had worked with at the Stratford Festival.

Cast

 Brent Carver as Robert Ross
 Martha Henry as Mrs. Ross
 William Hutt as Mr. Ross
 Ann-Marie MacDonald as Rowena Ross
 Jackie Burroughs as Miss Davenport
 Jean LeClerc Captain Taffler 
 Domini Blythe as Lady Barbara d'Orsey
 Alan Scarfe as Captain Leather
 Margaret Tyzack as Lady Emmeline
 Barbara Budd as Nurse Turner
 Susan Wright as Ella
 Richard Austin as Michael
 Rodger Barton as Charles 
 Paul Batten as Poole
 Rod Beattie as Levitt
 Tom Bishop as Rider
 Kirsten Bishopric as Peggy Ross
 Richard Blackburn as Sergeant
 Fred Booker as Verger
 Dwayne Brenna as Tom Bryant
 Michael Caruana as Soldier
 Shirley Cassedy as Honor
 Clare Coulter as Eena
 Richard Curnock as Minister
 Shirley Douglas as Mrs. Lawson
 David Dunbar as Mr. Brown
 Rupert Frazer as Clive
 Craig Gardner as German Soldier
 Graeme Gibson as Devlin
 Maurice Good as Sergeant Joyce
 Bob Hannah as Major Mickle 
 Paul Hubbard as Captain Ord
 Jeff Hyslop as Clifford Purchas
 Eleanor Kane as Woman
 James Kidnie as Martial
 Leo Leyden as Bishop
 Hardee T. Lineham as Bonnycastle
 Robin McKenzie as Stuart Ross
 David Main as Mr. Lawson
 William Merton Malmo as Collins Louis Negan
 Jefferson Mappin as Teddy Budge
 Marti Maraden as Lady of Easy Virtue
 Anne McKay as Child
 Richard McMillan as Harris
 David Robb as Major Terry
 Stephen Russell as Cigarette
 Abigail Seaton as Juliet
 Heather Summerhayes as Heather
 Irene Sutcliffe as Nurse
 Simon Treves as Patient
 Annette Vyge as Madam
 Timothy Webber as Corporal Bates

Production
The film was produced by Nielsen-Ferns International and the National Film Board of Canada, the first time the NFB had ever collaborated on a narrative feature film with a commercial production company. Shooting began in May 1981 near Longview, Alberta, but within days Phillips had to revise the production schedule due to unforeseen late snowfall in the area.

Other scenes for the film were shot in Calgary, Kleinburg, Hamilton and Montreal. However, due to technical problems with the sound, much of the film had to be rerecorded in the post-production phase, resulting in one of the key delays from the film's originally planned release date of early 1982.

Distribution
Organizers of the Festival of Festivals attempted to secure the film as the opening gala of the 1982 Festival of Festivals; however, due to a conflict between Nielsen-Ferns, the NFB and key funder Torstar, it was unable to secure the premiere and instead opened with the Australian film We of the Never Never.

Additional production conflict was also reported between Nielsen-Ferns and the NFB, resulting in additional delays in securing distribution. While theatrical distribution in North America and the United Kingdom was still in flux, a subtitled version of the film was broadcast on German television in March 1983.

The film was acquired by Spectrafilm in May 1983 for theatrical distribution, and had its theatrical premiere in November. Its premiere was organized as a fundraising benefit for the Parkinson Foundation of Canada, following Findley's father's death of Parkinson's disease.

Following its initial theatrical run, the film was not widely seen for many years, until it was acquired by the Canada Media Fund for distribution on its Encore+ YouTube channel in 2020.

Awards
The film received three Genie Awards from the Academy of Canadian Cinema and Television in 1984, for Best Actress (Henry), Best Supporting Actress (Burroughs) and Best Sound Editing (Sharon Lackie, Bruce Nyznik, and Bernard Bordeleau). It was also nominated for Best Picture, Best Editing (Tony Lower), Best Overall Sound (Hans Peter Strobl), and Best Screenplay (Findley).

References

External links

1983 films
1983 drama films
1983 LGBT-related films
Canadian war drama films
Canadian LGBT-related films
LGBT-related drama films
Films based on Canadian novels
Works by Timothy Findley
National Film Board of Canada films
1980s English-language films
Canadian World War I films
1980s Canadian films